Brachymonas chironomi is a Gram-negative, nonmotile, aerobic, oxidase-positive, catalase-positive, chemo-organotrophic bacterium from the genus Brachymonas and  family Comamonadaceae, which was isolated from a chironomid egg mass in Israel. Brachymonas chironomi occur as single cells ore as pairs and sometimes as chains. The colony color of B. chironomi is beige and changes after a few days into brown-beige.

References

External links
Type strain of Brachymonas chironomi at BacDive -  the Bacterial Diversity Metadatabase

Comamonadaceae
Bacteria described in 2009